Fritillaria yuzhongensis is a plant species native to China (Gansu, Henan, Ningxia, Shaanxi, Shanxi).

The flowers are nodding, pendent, bell-shaped, yellowish-green with purple markings.

References

yuzhongensis
Endemic flora of China
Plants described in 1985